Piazza della Cisterna is a piazza in San Gimignano, Italy.  It has a triangular shape with a slight natural slope and is connected to the nearby Piazza del Duomo by an open passage.  The pavement is brick and the piazza is surrounded by houses and medieval towers. 

In the south-west corner, the piazza meets the Arc of Becci, (l'arco dei Becci), an ancient city gate. The arc is flanked by the massive rectangular towers of Becci (torri dei Becci) on the left and Cugnanesi (torri dei Cugnanesi) on the right.

Past the access to via di Castello, the northern side is characterized by Cortesi Palace, la torre del Diavolo, and the houses of Cattani.

The west side is adorned with various towers, like the twin towers of Ardinghelli and the tower of palazzo Pellaro.

History

The piazza is located at the intersection of two main streets of the village of San Gimignano: la via Francigena and la via Pisa - Siena.  The piazza was used as a market and a stage for festivals and tournaments.  Its current layout dates from the thirteenth century.

The piazza is named after the underground cistern (Cisterna) built in 1287. The cistern is capped by a travertine octagonal pedestal, which was built in 1346 under the mayor Guccio Malavolti and is close to the center of the square.

References
 Toscana. Guida d'Italia ("Guida rossa"), Touring Club Italiano, Milano, 2003.

Piazzas in San Gimignano